Jana Novotná and Arantxa Sánchez Vicario were the defending champions, but lost in quarterfinals to Brenda Schultz-McCarthy and Rennae Stubbs.

Gigi Fernández and Natasha Zvereva won the title by defeating Brenda Schultz-McCarthy and Rennae Stubbs 7–5, 6–3 in the final. It was the 4th US Open, 14th Grand Slam title and 61st overall title for Fernández and the 3rd US Open, 14th Grand Slam title and 56th overall title for Zvereva, in their respective doubles careers. It was also the 6th title for the pair during the season, after their wins in Tokyo, Rome, the French Open, San Diego and Los Angeles.

Seeds

Qualifying

Draw

Finals

Top half

Section 1

Section 2

Bottom half

Section 3

Section 4

References
 Official Results Archive (WTA)
1995 US Open – Women's draws and results at the International Tennis Federation

Women's Doubles
US Open (tennis) by year – Women's doubles
1995 in women's tennis
1995 in American women's sports